Jaydy Michel Brixon (born December 20, 1975) is a Mexican actress and fashion model.

Early life
Born to a Mexican father and an American mother, Jaydy Michel grew up in Puerto Vallarta, although she was born in Guadalajara, the capital of the state of Jalisco.

Career
She began her modeling career in Mexico, first in beauty pageants such as Miss Jalisco.

A friend of her mother recommended that she go to Europe. Michel went to Spain in 1994, beginning her career as an international model. Since then, she has been featured in many top magazines and fashion shows, both in Mexico and Europe.

She made her debut as an actress in the Spanish movie Isi/Disi, starring Santiago Segura and Florentino Fernández.

In 2007, she started working in the Spanish series Los Serrano, until its end in 2008. She played the role of an English teacher named Celia, replacing the deceased Lucía.

In 2013, she began hosting the fourth season of Mexico's Next Top Model.

Personal life
Michel and Spanish singer Alejandro Sanz married in Bali on December 30, 1999; however, this marriage was never legally recognized in either of their home countries. The couple divorced in 2005. Their daughter, Manuela Sánchez Michel, was born in 2001. Michel divides her time amongst Mexico, Spain, and Miami.

On January 4, 2011, she married Mexican international football player Rafael Márquez on the beach in Manzanillo, Colima, Mexico and had one child named Leonardo Márquez Michel (born 2016 ).

External links

1975 births
Living people
Mexican expatriates in Spain
Mexican female models
Mexican people of American descent
Mexican people of French descent
People from Guadalajara, Jalisco